The siege of Bintan of 1526 was a military operation in which Portuguese forces successfully sieged, assaulted and destroyed the city of Bintan (Bintão, in Portuguese), capital of the former sultan of Malacca Mahmud Shah.

Context
In 1511, the second Portuguese governor of India Afonso de Albuquerque captured the great Malayan city of Malacca. Sultan Mahmud fled with his forces to Bintan, which he usurped from its ruler. He built a new city and fleet there, and continuously harassed Portuguese Malacca and its shipping.

The captain of Malacca, Dom Pedro de Mascarenhas had dispatched a flotilla of oarships to Bintan, tasked with blockading it.

Promoted by King John III to the position of Governor of India in 1526 but unable to sail to Goa due to the weather, Dom Pedro decided to take advantage of the unusually high number of soldiers then available at Malacca to put a definitive end to the threat posed by Mahmud.

Pedro Mascarenhas first put into circulation the rumour that his expedition was intended to carry out the construction of a fort at the Sunda Strait. He departed Malacca on October 23, 1526, with a galleon, a carrack (nau in Portuguese), two small carracks, two caravels, one galley, one half-galley, five light-galleys and two armed batels equipped with heavy caliber camelos and pavises, bearing about 600 Portuguese soldiers. They were further supported by an unrecorded number of escravos de peleja ("combat slaves") and 400 auxiliary Malays, under the command of Tuão Mafamede.

The siege

The city of Bintan was located on a small island, connected by a fortified bridge to a larger crescent-shaped island that surrounded it. The Portuguese found its main defenses to be the mangrove swamps that made landings perilous, complemented by a moat surrounding the city, poisoned timber stakes, and a tall stockade furnished with artillery. Heavy ships like the galleons and carracks could only approach the city via a narrow canal, which was blocked by vertical wooden stakes driven into the muddy seabed. On a small hill in the middle of the city, surrounded by another stockade furnished with artillery stood the fortified dwellings of Sultan Mahmud. The sultans fleet however was reduced to 20 oarships that had survived from a recent battle with the Portuguese at Linga.

Although Mascarenhas could assault the city resorting only to his light oarvessels, he decided instead for a safer drawn-out siege, where he would blockade the island and slowly but surely remove all the stakes from the canal, allowing the larger ships to bombard the city with their heavy artillery when it was assaulted.

The approach to the city

The Portuguese began by bombarding a stockade Mahmud had built on an islet by the entrance to the canal, with the galleon, a carrack and the two batels protected by pavises and heavy rope mats. The Malays responded with their own artillery which however was lighter than those of the Portuguese. Unable to seriously damage their vessels, the Malays abandoned the islet an hour later and the Portuguese captured 20 light artillery pieces there. The following day, the Portuguese proceeded in similar manner against another stockade located on another islet protecting the channel, which was likewise abandoned.

The Portuguese then set about painstakingly removing the hundreds of wooden stakes driven onto the muddy channel floor blocking the entrance of the heavy ships, and made of a wood the Portuguese dubbed pau-ferro, literally, "iron-wood", all while under fire of the Malay artillery.

At the end of ten days, the Portuguese were attacked by a flotilla of 30 lancharas and 2000 men dispatched by an ally of Sultan Mahmud, the Sultan of Pahang, then at war with the Portuguese. They retreated after a stiff but brief fight and the Portuguese captured 18 vessels.

After 24 days, all stakes had been removed and the Portuguese anchored their fleet close to the main Malayan bulwark that defended the city and the bridge.

Battle within the channel

Very early the following day, the Malays attacked with their 20 last remaining oarships the Portuguese galley and caravel, which were closest to the city. Both vessels were grappled and boarded, but the Malays were unable to overcome their defenders before being themselves forced to retreat by the two Portuguese longboats equipped with heavy-caliber artillery, led by Pedro de Mascarenhas, who had boarded a boat with twenty soldiers. 13 oarships were captured, and the Malay admiral was found among the dead.

Assault on the city

That night, the Portuguese learned from a Malay boy that the city could be most easily stormed via the bridge, and these informations were confirmed by a Portuguese POW who had fled the city.

Very early on the following day, Mascarenhas landed 100 Portuguese soldiers and 300 Malays on the island on which the city of Bintan stood, and under the protection of the ships artillery had a small stockade equipped with light artillery built on the beach. Believing the Portuguese would assault the city from there, the Malays concentrated most of their forces on the city facing that side.

As midnight approached however, Mascarenhas personally led 300 Portuguese soldiers, 100 combat slaves and Malay auxiliaries ashore on the crescent shaped island, through the muddy mangrove swamp that at times covered the Portuguese to their waists, in the middle of pitch-black darkness in absolute silence.

As day broke, the Portuguese fleet opened fire and its crewmen landed as they sounded their trumpets, which drew the Malays attention away from the bridge. By the cry of Santiago! and at the sound of trumpets, Mascarenhas ordered the assault on the stockade that defended the entrance to the bridge, the Portuguese throwing clay bombs filled with gunpowder, sending its few defenders into a flight. The city was then stormed, the sailors having taken part in the assault, throwing clay bombs. By 10am the city had been taken.

That day, the Portuguese were joined by their ally, the Sultan of Linga, accompanied by 20 oarvessels, who helped with mop-up operations.

Aftermath

The Portuguese captured rich spoil, including 300 pieces of artillery. The city was then torched. The islands of Bintan were then restored to its former ruler, whom Sultan Mahmud had displaced and who accepted to become an ally of Portugal.

The Portuguese managed to capture a great number of the Sultans Court, servants, harem and part of his royal treasure in the vicinity of the city, where they killed many who had not been able to flee in time. The harem was gifted to the Sultan of Linga, an ally of the Portuguese. Mascarenhas remained in Bintan for 15 days, capturing and dividing spoils, organizing the voyage back home, and hunting for those who had fled, but which the Portuguese found impossible to pursue into the jungle.

Mahmud had been among the first to flee the city, and he survived the battle. The Sultan escaped through the jungle and fled to Kampar on Sumatra, where he died two years later.

The defeat of the former Sultan of Malacca at Bintan impressed many rulers around the Strait, who sent the Portuguese embassies seeking treaties, which afforded Malacca great prosperity for many years thereafter.

See also
Portuguese Malacca

References 

Bintan
Bintan (1526)
Bintan
1526 in the Portuguese Empire
Portuguese Malacca
History of Malacca
Portuguese colonialism in Indonesia